Weather news, Weather News, Weathernews, and WeatherNews may refer to:

 The Weather Channel
 AccuWeather Network
 Sky News Weather Channel
 WeatherNation TV
 Weathernews LiVE